Kaoser English School is a senior secondary school in Kannur. The campus - spread over 15 acres, provides play grounds, recreation areas, a mosque, canteen, libraries, science laboratories, and computer labs - is located at Kakkad.

Origin 
Kaoser English School, founded in 1994, is the prime project of the Kaoser Charitable Trust. The Trust, a charitable organization, is managing a number of educational institutions and charitable services. Affiliated to CBSE, New Delhi, the school has grown to a full-fledged senior secondary school with over 700 students.

Campus 
Kaoser English School's campus, run by Kaoser Charitable Trust and affiliated to CBSE, is located at Kakkad, and is spread over 15 acres. The school has a fleet of buses to transport students from different parts of the district. The timing of the school is from 8.00 am to 2.00 pm.

Future plans
The school plans on implementing sweeping expansion plans in the next few years. These include a plan for hostel and allied facilities to enhance the learning experience.

Politics 
Kaoser is a stronghold of the Student's Islamic Organization. This is largely due to the links of the school with the Jamaat-E-Islami Hind movement. Several activities have been, in the past, carried out under the banner of SIO. Even though politics is not encouraged openly, the overt presence of an overwhelming number of Muslim students have made SIO the sole student political body in the school.

References

External links
  Official website

Private schools in Kerala
Primary schools in Kerala
High schools and secondary schools in Kerala
Schools in Kannur
1994 establishments in Kerala